Studia Patristica is a peer-reviewed, academic book series established in 1957 and focused on the study of patristics.

History
The series is the official publication of the Oxford International Conference on Patristic Studies, which was first convened in Oxford, England in 1951 under the direction of F. L. Cross. The conference has met at four-year intervals since. Conference papers have been published in the Studia Patristica since the 1955 conference.

Publishers
The series was initially published by Akademie-Verlag. Since volume 15, it has been published annually by Peeters Publishers

Expansion of areas of coverage
Since 2011, the series also serves as the official publication of other national and international patristic conferences, including the National Conference on Patristic Studies (Faculty of Divinity, Cambridge University) under Allen Brent, Thomas Graumann, and Judith Lieu (2009), "The Image of the Perfect Christian in Patristic Thought" Conference at the Ukrainian Catholic University under Taras Khomych, Oleksandra Vakula, and Oleh Kindiy (2009), and the British Patristics Conference in Durham, England in September 2010. 

Additionally, beginning in 2012, Peeters Publishers has begun publishing the Studia Patristica Supplements, a series of separate monographs on topics related to the field of patristics.

Editors
The current editors are:
 Markus Vinzent (King's College London)
 Allen Brent (King's College,London)

Past editors have been:

See also 
 Religion
 Early Christianity
 History of Christianity
 History of religion
 Religious studies
 Doctor of Divinity
 Academic journal
 Conference proceedings
 Monographic series
 Serial (publishing)

References

External links 
 
 

Patristic journals
Publications established in 1957
Annual journals
Peeters Publishers academic journals
English-language journals